Dangereuse Attraction is the second studio album by Canadian singer Marie-Mai. The album was released on 28 August 2007 in Canada by Musicor and later, in France by Warner Music France, on 26 May 2008. The album was produced by Fred St-Gelais. The album was certified gold by Music Canada.

Track listing

Personnel
 Marie-Mai – vocals, composer
 Fred St-Gelais - producer, guitar, bass, keyboard, percussion, drum, programming
 Rob Wells – arranger, composer, keyboard
 Martin Tremblay – keyboard
 Jimmy Guay – drum
 Marc Lessard – drum
 Maxime Lalanne – drum
 Veronica Thomas and Pascale Gagnon – violin
 Ligia Paquin – alto

References 

Marie-Mai albums
2004 albums
Warner Music France albums